This list of birds of Rhode Island is a comprehensive listing of all the bird species confirmed in the U.S. state of Rhode Island. Unless otherwise noted, the list is that of the Rhode Island Avian Records Committee (RIARC)with some additions from Avibase. As of July 2021, there are 446 species on the list, of which 175 have nested. In addition, 123 are considered vagrants, six have been introduced to North America, and two are extinct. The state's review list (see below) contains 127 species.

This list is presented in the taxonomic sequence of the Check-list of North and Middle American Birds, 7th edition through the 62nd Supplement, published by the American Ornithological Society (AOS). Common and scientific names are also those of the Check-list, except that the common names of families are from the Clements taxonomy because the AOS list does not include them.

Unless otherwise noted, all species listed below are considered to occur regularly in Rhode Island as permanent residents, summer or winter visitors, or migrants. These tags are used to annotate some species:

(B) Breeding (nesting) - confirmed nesting record(s) within Rhode Island
(I) Introduced - a species introduced to North America by the actions of humans, either directly or indirectly
(E) Extinct - a recent species that no longer exists
(V) Vagrant - birds considered to be accidental visitors, with few modern records; all of them are included on the review list
(R) Review list - birds that if seen require more comprehensive documentation than regularly seen species. These birds are considered irregular or rare in Rhode Island.

Ducks, geese, and waterfowl

Order: AnseriformesFamily: Anatidae

The family Anatidae includes the ducks and most duck-like waterfowl, such as geese and swans. These birds are adapted to an aquatic existence with webbed feet, bills which are flattened to a greater or lesser extent, and feathers that are excellent at shedding water due to special oils. Forty-five species have been recorded in Rhode Island.

Black-bellied whistling-duck, Dendrocygna autumnalis (V)(R)
Fulvous whistling-duck, Dendrocygna bicolor (V)(R)
Snow goose, Anser caerulescens
Ross's goose, Anser rossii (V)(R)
Graylag goose, Anser anser (V)(R)
Greater white-fronted goose, Anser albifrons
Pink-footed goose, Anser brachyrhynchus (V)(R)
Brant, Branta bernicla
Barnacle goose, Branta leucopsis (V)(R)
Cackling goose, Branta hutchinsii (V)(R)
Canada goose, Branta canadensis (B)
Mute swan, Cygnus olor (I)(B)
Trumpeter swan, Cygnus buccinator (V)(R)
Tundra swan, Cygnus columbianus (R)
Wood duck, Aix sponsa (B)
Blue-winged teal, Spatula discors (B)
Cinnamon teal, Spatula cyanoptera (V)(R)
Northern shoveler, Spatula clypeata
Gadwall, Mareca strepera (B)
Eurasian wigeon, Mareca penelope
American wigeon, Mareca americana
Mallard, Anas platyrhynchos (B)
American black duck, Anas rubripes (B)
Northern pintail, Anas acuta
Green-winged teal, Anas crecca (B)
Canvasback, Aythya valisineria
Redhead, Aythya americana
Ring-necked duck, Aythya collaris
Tufted duck, Aythya fuligula (V)(R)
Greater scaup, Aythya marila
Lesser scaup, Aythya affinis
King eider, Somateria spectabilis
Common eider, Somateria mollissima (B)
Harlequin duck, Histrionicus histrionicus
Surf scoter, Melanitta perspicillata
White-winged scoter, Melanitta deglandi
Black scoter, Melanitta americana
Long-tailed duck, Clangula hyemalis
Bufflehead, Bucephala albeola
Common goldeneye, Bucephala clangula
Barrow's goldeneye, Bucephala islandica
Smew, Mergullus albellus (V)(R)
Hooded merganser, Lophodytes cucullatus (B)
Common merganser, Mergus merganser
Red-breasted merganser, Mergus serrator (B)
Ruddy duck, Oxyura jamaicensis

New World quail
Order: GalliformesFamily: Odontophoridae

The New World quails are small, plump terrestrial birds only distantly related to the quails of the Old World, but named for their similar appearance and habits. One species has been recorded in Rhode Island.

Northern bobwhite, Colinus virginianus (B)

Pheasants, grouse, and allies
Order: GalliformesFamily: Phasianidae

Phasianidae consists of the pheasants and their allies. These are terrestrial species, variable in size but generally plump with broad relatively short wings. Many species are gamebirds or have been domesticated as a food source for humans. Turkeys have a distinctive fleshy wattle that hangs from the underside of the beak and a fleshy protuberance that hangs from the top of its beak called a snood. As with many galliform species, the female (the hen) is smaller than the male (the tom) and much less colorful. With wingspans of 1.5–1.8 meters (almost 6 feet), the turkeys are the largest birds in the open forests in which they live and are rarely mistaken for any other species. Grouse inhabit temperate and subarctic regions of the Northern Hemisphere. They are game and are sometimes hunted for food. In all Rhode Island species, males are polygamous and have elaborate courtship displays. These heavily built birds have legs feathered to the toes. Most species are year-round residents and do not migrate. Four species of this family have been recorded in Rhode Island.

Wild turkey, Meleagris gallopavo (B)
Ruffed grouse, Bonasa umbellus (B)
Greater prairie-chicken, Tympanuchus cupido (extirpated)
Heath hen, T. c. cupido (E)
Ring-necked pheasant, Phasianus colchicus (I)(B)

Grebes

Order: PodicipediformesFamily: Podicipedidae

Grebes are small to medium-large freshwater diving birds. They have lobed toes and are excellent swimmers and divers. However, they have their feet placed far back on the body, making them quite ungainly on land. Five species have been recorded in Rhode Island.

Pied-billed grebe, Podilymbus podiceps (B)
Horned grebe, Podiceps auritus
Red-necked grebe, Podiceps grisegena
Eared grebe, Podiceps nigricollis (R)
Western grebe, Aechmorphorus occidentalis (V)(R)

Pigeons and doves
Order: ColumbiformesFamily: Columbidae

Pigeons and doves are stout-bodied birds with short necks and short slender bills with a fleshy cere. Five species have been recorded in Rhode Island.

Rock pigeon, Columba livia (I)(B)
Eurasian collared-dove, Streptopelia decaocto (I)(V)(R)
Passenger pigeon, Ectopistes migratorius (E)
White-winged dove, Zenaida asiatica (V)(R)
Mourning dove, Zenaida macroura (B)

Cuckoos
Order: CuculiformesFamily: Cuculidae

The family Cuculidae includes cuckoos, roadrunners, and anis. These birds are of variable size with slender bodies, long tails, and strong legs. The Old World cuckoos are brood parasites. Three species have been recorded in Rhode Island.

Common cuckoo, Cuculus canorus (V)(R)
Yellow-billed cuckoo, Coccyzus americanus (B)
Black-billed cuckoo, Coccyzus erythropthalmus (B)

Nightjars and allies
Order: CaprimulgiformesFamily: Caprimulgidae

Nightjars are medium-sized nocturnal birds that usually nest on the ground. They have long wings, short legs, and very short bills. Most have small feet, of little use for walking, and long pointed wings. Their soft plumage is cryptically colored to resemble bark or leaves. Three species have been recorded in Rhode Island.

Common nighthawk,  Chordeiles minor (B)
Chuck-will's-widow,  Antrostomus carolinensis (V)(R)
Eastern whip-poor-will,  Antrostomus vociferus (B)

Swifts
Order: ApodiformesFamily: Apodidae

The swifts are small birds which spend the majority of their lives flying. These birds have very short legs and never settle voluntarily on the ground, perching instead only on vertical surfaces. Many swifts have long swept-back wings which resemble a crescent or boomerang. One species has been recorded in Rhode Island.

Chimney swift, Chaetura pelagica (B)

Hummingbirds

Order: ApodiformesFamily: Trochilidae

Hummingbirds are small birds capable of hovering in mid-air due to the rapid flapping of their wings. They are the only birds that can fly backwards. Three species have been recorded in Rhode Island.

Ruby-throated hummingbird, Archilochus colubris (B)
Calliope hummingbird, Selasphorus calliope (V)(R)
Rufous hummingbird, Selasphorus rufus (V)(R)

Rails, gallinules, and coots

Order: GruiformesFamily: Rallidae

Rallidae is a large family of small to medium-sized birds which includes the rails, crakes, coots, and gallinules. The most typical family members occupy dense vegetation in damp environments near lakes, swamps, or rivers. In general they are shy and secretive birds, making them difficult to observe. Most species have strong legs and long toes which are well adapted to soft uneven surfaces. They tend to have short, rounded wings and to be weak fliers. Ten species have been recorded in Rhode Island.

Clapper rail, Rallus crepitans (B)
King rail, Rallus elegans (R)(B)
Virginia rail, Rallus limicola (B)
Corn crake, Crex crex (V)(R)
Sora, Porzana carolina (B)
Common gallinule, Gallinula galeata (B)
American coot, Fulica americana
Purple gallinule, Porphyrio martinica (V)(R)
Yellow rail, Coturnicops noveboracensis (V)(R)
Black rail, Laterallus jamaicensis (V)(R)

Cranes
Order: GruiformesFamily: Gruidae

Cranes are large, long-legged, and long-necked birds. Unlike the similar-looking but unrelated herons, cranes fly with necks outstretched, not pulled back. Most have elaborate and noisy courting displays or "dances". One species has been recorded in Rhode Island.

Sandhill crane, Antigone canadensis (R)

Stilts and avocets
Order: CharadriiformesFamily: Recurvirostridae

Recurvirostridae is a family of large wading birds which includes the avocets and stilts. The avocets have long legs and long up-curved bills. The stilts have extremely long legs and long, thin, straight bills. Two species have been recorded in Rhode Island.

Black-necked stilt, Himantopus mexicanus (V)(R)
American avocet, Recurvirostra americana

Oystercatchers
Order: CharadriiformesFamily: Haematopodidae

The oystercatchers are large, obvious and noisy plover-like birds, with strong bills used for smashing or prying open molluscs. One species has been recorded in Rhode Island.

American oystercatcher, Haematopus palliatus (B)

Plovers and lapwings

Order: CharadriiformesFamily: Charadriidae

The family Charadriidae includes the plovers, dotterels, and lapwings. They are small to medium-sized birds with compact bodies, short thick necks, and long, usually pointed, wings. They are found in open country worldwide, mostly in habitats near water. Ten species have been recorded in Rhode Island.

Northern lapwing, Vanellus vanellus (V)(R)
Black-bellied plover, Pluvialis squatarola
American golden-plover, Pluvialis dominica
Killdeer, Charadrius vociferus (B)
Common ringed plover, Charadrius hiaticula (V)(R)
Semipalmated plover, Charadrius semipalmatus
Piping plover, Charadrius melodus (B)
Lesser sand-plover, Charadrius mongolus (V)(R)
Wilson's plover, Charadrius wilsonia (V)(R)
Snowy plover, Charadrius nivosus (V)(R)

Sandpipers and allies

Order: CharadriiformesFamily: Scolopacidae

Scolopacidae is a large diverse family of small to medium-sized shorebirds including the sandpipers, curlews, godwits, shanks, tattlers, woodcocks, snipes, dowitchers, and phalaropes. The majority of these species eat small invertebrates picked out of the mud or soil. Different lengths of legs and bills enable multiple species to feed in the same habitat, particularly on the coast, without direct competition for food. Thirty-nine species have been recorded in Rhode Island.

Upland sandpiper, Bartramia longicauda (B)
Whimbrel, Numenius phaeopus
Eskimo curlew, Numenius borealis (V per the RIARC, but generally considered extinct)(R)
Long-billed curlew, Numenius americanus (V)(R)
Hudsonian godwit, Limosa haemastica
Marbled godwit, Limosa fedoa
Ruddy turnstone, Arenaria interpres
Red knot, Calidris canutus
Ruff, Calidris pugnax (R)
Sharp-tailed sandpiper, Calidris acuminata (V)(R)
Stilt sandpiper, Calidris himantopus
Curlew sandpiper, Calidris ferruginea (V)(R)
Red-necked stint, Calidris ruficollis (V)(R)
Sanderling, Calidris alba
Dunlin, Calidris alpina
Purple sandpiper, Calidris maritima
Baird's sandpiper, Calidris bairdii
Little stint, Calidris minuta (V)(R)
Least sandpiper, Calidris minutilla 
White-rumped sandpiper, Calidris fuscicollis
Buff-breasted sandpiper, Calidris subruficollis
Pectoral sandpiper, Calidris melanotos
Semipalmated sandpiper, Calidris pusilla
Western sandpiper, Calidris mauri
Short-billed dowitcher, Limnodromus griseus
Long-billed dowitcher, Limnodromus scolopaceus (R)
American woodcock, Scolopax minor (B)
Wilson's snipe, Gallinago delicata 
Terek sandpiper, Xenus cinereus (V)(R)
Spotted sandpiper, Actitis macularia (B)
Solitary sandpiper, Tringa solitaria
Lesser yellowlegs, Tringa flavipes
Willet, Tringa semipalmata (B)
Spotted redshank, Tringa erythropus (V)(R)
Greater yellowlegs, Tringa melanoleuca
Wood sandpiper, Tringa glareola (V)(R)
Wilson's phalarope, Phalaropus tricolor 
Red-necked phalarope, Phalaropus lobatus
Red phalarope, Phalaropus fulicarius

Skuas and jaegers
Order: CharadriiformesFamily: Stercorariidae

They are in general medium to large birds, typically with gray or brown plumage, often with white markings on the wings. They have longish bills with hooked tips and webbed feet with sharp claws. They look like large dark gulls, but have a fleshy cere above the upper mandible. They are strong, acrobatic fliers. Five species have been recorded in Rhode Island.

Great skua, Stercorarius skua (V)(R)
South polar skua, Stercorarius maccormicki (R)
Pomarine jaeger, Stercorarius pomarinus
Parasitic jaeger, Stercorarius parasiticus
Long-tailed jaeger, Stercorarius longicaudus (R)

Auks, murres, and puffins

Order: CharadriiformesFamily: Alcidae

Alcids are superficially similar to penguins due to their black-and-white colors, their upright posture, and some of their habits, however they are only distantly related to the penguins and are able to fly. Auks live on the open sea, only deliberately coming ashore to nest. Eight species have been recorded in Rhode Island.

Dovekie, Alle alle
Common murre, Uria aalge
Thick-billed murre, Uria lomvia (R)
Razorbill, Alca torda
Great auk, Pinguinus impennis (E)
Black guillemot, Cepphus grylle
Long-billed murrelet, Brachyramphus perdix (V)(R)
Atlantic puffin, Fratercula arctica (V)(R)

Gulls, terns, and skimmers

Order: CharadriiformesFamily: Laridae

Laridae is a family of medium to large seabirds and includes gulls, terns, kittiwakes, and skimmers. They are typically gray or white, often with black markings on the head or wings. They have stout, longish bills and webbed feet.  Thirty-three species have been recorded in Rhode Island.

Black-legged kittiwake, Rissa tridactyla
Ivory gull, Pagophila eburnea (V)(R)
Sabine's gull, Xema sabini (V)(R)
Bonaparte's gull, Chroicocephalus philadelphia
Black-headed gull, Chroicocephalus ridibundus 
Little gull, Hydrocoleus minutus (R)
Ross's gull, Rhodostethia rosea (V)(R)
Laughing gull, Leucophaeus atricilla
Franklin's gull, Leucophaeus pipixcan (V)(R)
Black-tailed gull, Larus crassirostris (V)(R)
Heermann's  gull, Larus heermanni (V)(R)
Common gull, Larus canus  (V)(R)
Short-billed gull, Larus brachyrhynchus (V) (R)
Ring-billed gull, Larus delawarensis 
Herring gull, Larus argentatus (B)
Iceland gull, Larus glaucoides
Lesser black-backed gull, Larus fuscus
Glaucous gull, Larus hyperboreus
Great black-backed gull, Larus marinus (B)
Brown noddy, Anous stolidus (V)(R)
Sooty tern, Onychoprion fuscata (V)(R)
Bridled tern, Onychoprion anaethetus (V)(R)
Least tern, Sternula antillarum (B)
Gull-billed tern, Gelochelidon nilotica (V)(R)
Caspian tern, Hydroprogne caspia
Black tern, Chlidonias niger
Roseate tern, Sterna dougallii (B)
Common tern, Sterna hirundo (B)
Arctic tern, Sterna paradisaea (V)(R)
Forster's tern, Sterna forsteri 
Royal tern, Thalasseus maxima
Sandwich tern, Thalasseus sandvicensis (R)
Black skimmer, Rynchops niger

Tropicbirds
Order: PhaethontiformesFamily: Phaethontidae

Tropicbirds are slender white birds of tropical oceans with exceptionally long central tail feathers. Their long wings have black markings, as does the head. Two species have been recorded in Rhode Island.

White-tailed tropicbird, Phaethon lepturus (V)(R)
Red-billed tropicbird, Phaethon aethereus (V)(R)

Loons

Order: GaviiformesFamily: Gaviidae

Loons are aquatic birds, the size of a large duck, to which they are unrelated. Their plumage is largely gray or black, and they have spear-shaped bills. Loons swim well and fly adequately, but are almost hopeless on land, because their legs are placed towards the rear of the body. Three species have been recorded in Rhode Island.

Red-throated loon, Gavia stellata
Pacific loon, Gavia pacifica (R)
Common loon, Gavia immer

Albatrosses
Order: ProcellariiformesFamily: Diomedeidae

The albatrosses are amongst the largest of flying birds, and the great albatrosses from the genus Diomedea have the largest wingspans of any extant birds. One species has been recorded in Rhode Island.

Yellow-nosed albatross, Thalassarche chlororhynchos (V)(R)

Southern storm-petrels
Order: ProcellariiformesFamily: Oceanitidae

The storm-petrels are the smallest seabirds, relatives of the petrels, feeding on planktonic crustaceans and small fish picked from the surface, typically while hovering. The flight is fluttering and sometimes bat-like. Until 2018, this family's three species were included with the other storm-petrels in family Hydrobatidae.

Wilson's storm-petrel, Oceanites oceanicus
White-faced storm-petrel, Pelagodroma marina (V)(R)

Northern storm-petrels

Order: ProcellariiformesFamily: Hydrobatidae

Though the members of this family are similar in many respects to the southern storm-petrels, including their general appearance and habits, there are enough genetic differences to warrant their placement in a separate family.

Leach's storm-petrel, Hydrobates leucorhous (R)
Band-rumped storm-petrel, Hydrobates castro (V)(R)

Shearwaters and petrels

Order: ProcellariiformesFamily: Procellariidae

The Procellariids are the main group of medium-sized "true petrels", characterized by united nostrils with medium septum and a long outer functional primary. Seven species have been recorded in Rhode Island.

Northern fulmar, Fulmarus glacialis
Black-capped petrel, Pterodroma hasitata (V)(R)
Cory's shearwater, Calonectris diomedea
Sooty shearwater, Ardenna griseus
Great shearwater, Ardenna gravis
Manx shearwater, Puffinus puffinus 
Audubon's shearwater, Puffinus lherminieri (V)(R)

Storks
Order: CiconiiformesFamily: Ciconiidae

Storks are large, heavy, long-legged, long-necked wading birds with long stout bills and wide wingspans. They lack the powder down that other wading birds such as herons, spoonbills, and ibises use to clean off fish slime. Storks lack a pharynx and are mute. One species has been recorded in Rhode Island.

Wood stork, Mycteria americana (V)(R)

Frigatebirds
Order: SuliformesFamily: Fregatidae

Frigatebirds are large seabirds usually found over tropical oceans. They are large, black, or black-and-white, with long wings and deeply forked tails. The males have colored inflatable throat pouches. They do not swim or walk and cannot take off from a flat surface. Having the largest wingspan-to-body-weight ratio of any bird, they are essentially aerial, able to stay aloft for more than a week. One species has been recorded in Rhode Island.

Magnificent frigatebird, Fregata magnificens (V)(R)

Boobies and gannets
Order: SuliformesFamily: Sulidae

The sulids comprise the gannets and boobies. Both groups are medium-large coastal seabirds that plunge-dive for fish. Two species have been recorded in Rhode Island.

Brown booby, Sula leucogaster (V)(R)
Northern gannet, Morus bassanus

Anhingas
Order: SuliformesFamily: Anhingidae

Anhingas are cormorant-like water birds with very long necks and long, straight beaks. They are fish eaters which often swim with only their neck above the water. One species has been recorded in Rhode Island.

Anhinga, Anhinga anhinga (V)(R)

Cormorants and shags
Order: SuliformesFamily: Phalacrocoracidae

Cormorants are medium-to-large aquatic birds, usually with mainly dark plumage and areas of colored skin on the face. The bill is long, thin, and sharply hooked. Their feet are four-toed and webbed. Two species have been recorded in Rhode Island.

Great cormorant, Phalacrocorax carbo
Double-crested cormorant, Nannopterum auritum (B)

Pelicans
Order: PelecaniformesFamily: Pelecanidae

Pelicans are very large water birds with a distinctive pouch under their beak. Like other birds in the order Pelecaniformes, they have four webbed toes. Two species have been recorded in Rhode Island.

American white pelican, Pelecanus erythrorhynchos (V)(R)
Brown pelican, Pelecanus occidentalis (V)(R)

Herons, egrets, and bitterns

Order: PelecaniformesFamily: Ardeidae

The family Ardeidae contains the herons, egrets, and bitterns. Herons and egrets are medium to large wading birds with long necks and legs. Bitterns tend to be shorter necked and more secretive. Members of Ardeidae fly with their necks retracted, unlike other long-necked birds such as storks, ibises, and spoonbills. Thirteen species have been recorded in Rhode Island.

American bittern, Botaurus lentiginosus (B)
Least bittern, Ixobrychus exilis (B)
Great blue heron, Ardea herodias (B)
Great egret, Ardea alba (B)
Little egret, Egretta garzetta (V)(R)
Snowy egret, Egretta thula (B)
Little blue heron, Egretta caerulea (B)
Tricolored heron, Egretta tricolor
Reddish egret, Egretta rufescens (V)(R)
Cattle egret, Bubulcus ibis (B)
Green heron, Butorides virescens (B)
Black-crowned night-heron, Nycticorax nycticorax (B)
Yellow-crowned night-heron, Nyctanassa violacea (B)

Ibises and spoonbills
Order: PelecaniformesFamily: Threskiornithidae

The family Threskiornithidae includes the ibises and spoonbills. They have long, broad wings. Their bodies tend to be elongated, the neck more so, with rather long legs. The bill is also long, decurved in the case of the ibises, straight and distinctively flattened in the spoonbills. Three species have been recorded in Rhode Island.

White ibis, Eudocimus albus (V)(R)
Glossy ibis, Plegadis falcinellus (B)
White-faced ibis, Plegadis chihi (V)(R)

New World vultures
Order: CathartiformesFamily: Cathartidae

The New World vultures are not closely related to Old World vultures, but superficially resemble them because of convergent evolution. Like the Old World vultures, they are scavengers. However, unlike Old World vultures, which find carcasses by sight, New World vultures have a good sense of smell with which they locate carcasses. Two species have been recorded in Rhode Island.

Black vulture, Coragyps atratus 
Turkey vulture, Cathartes aura (B)

Osprey
Order: AccipitriformesFamily: Pandionidae

Pandionidae is a family of fish-eating birds of prey possessing a very large, powerful hooked beak for tearing flesh from their prey, strong legs, powerful talons, and keen eyesight. The family is monotypic.

Osprey, Pandion haliaetus (B)

Hawks, eagles, and kites

Order: AccipitriformesFamily: Accipitridae

Accipitridae is a family of birds of prey and includes the osprey, hawks, eagles, kites, harriers and Old World vultures. These birds have very large powerful hooked beaks for tearing flesh from their prey, strong legs, powerful talons, and keen eyesight. Fourteen species have been recorded in Rhode Island.

Swallow-tailed kite, Elanoides forficatus (V)(R)
Golden eagle, Aquila chrysaetos (R)
Northern harrier, Circus hudsonius (B)
Sharp-shinned hawk, Accipiter striatus (B)
Cooper's hawk, Accipiter cooperii (B)
Northern goshawk, Accipiter gentilis (B)
Bald eagle, Haliaeetus leucocephalus 
Mississippi kite, Ictinia mississippiensis (V)(R)
Red-shouldered hawk, Buteo lineatus (B)
Broad-winged hawk, Buteo platypterus (B)
Swainson's hawk, Buteo swainsoni (V)(R)
Zone-tailed hawk, Buteo albonotatus (V)(R)
Red-tailed hawk, Buteo jamaicensis (B)
Rough-legged hawk, Buteo lagopus

Barn-owls
Order: StrigiformesFamily: Tytonidae

Barn-owls are medium to large owls with large heads and characteristic heart-shaped faces. They have long strong legs with powerful talons. One species has been recorded in Rhode Island.

Barn owl, Tyto alba (B)

Owls

Order: StrigiformesFamily: Strigidae

Typical owls are small to large solitary nocturnal birds of prey. They have large forward-facing eyes and ears, a hawk-like beak, and a conspicuous circle of feathers around each eye called a facial disk. Eleven species have been recorded in Rhode Island.

Eastern screech-owl, Megascops asio (B)
Great horned owl, Bubo virginianus (B)
Snowy owl, Bubo scandiacus
Northern hawk owl, Surnia ulula (V)(R)
Burrowing owl, Athene cunicularia (V)(R)
Barred owl, Strix varia (B)
Great gray owl, Strix nebulosa (V)(R)
Long-eared owl, Asio otus (B)
Short-eared owl, Asio flammeus 
Boreal owl, Aegolius funereus (V)(R)
Northern saw-whet owl, Aegolius acadicus (B)

Kingfishers
Order: CoraciiformesFamily: Alcedinidae

Kingfishers are medium-sized birds with large heads, long, pointed bills, short legs, and stubby tails. One species has been recorded in Rhode Island.

Belted kingfisher, Megaceryle alcyon (B)

Woodpeckers

Order: PiciformesFamily: Picidae

Woodpeckers are small to medium-sized birds with chisel-like beaks, short legs, stiff tails, and long tongues used for capturing insects. Some species have feet with two toes pointing forward and two backward, while several species have only three toes. Many woodpeckers have the habit of tapping noisily on tree trunks with their beaks. Ten species have been recorded in Rhode Island.

Lewis's woodpecker, Melanerpes lewis (V)(R)
Red-headed woodpecker, Melanerpes erythrocephalus (B)
Red-bellied woodpecker, Melanerpes carolinus (B)
Yellow-bellied sapsucker, Sphyrapicus varius 
American three-toed woodpecker, Picoides dorsalis (V)(R)
Black-backed woodpecker, Picoides arcticus (V)(R)
Downy woodpecker, Dryobates pubescens (B)
Hairy woodpecker, Dryobates villosus (B)
Northern flicker, Colaptes auratus (B)
Pileated woodpecker, Dryocopus pileatus (B)

Falcons and caracaras
Order: FalconiformesFamily: Falconidae

Falconidae is a family of diurnal birds of prey, notably the falcons and caracaras. They differ from hawks, eagles, and kites in that they kill with their beaks instead of their talons. Four species have been recorded in Rhode Island.

American kestrel, Falco sparverius (B)
Merlin, Falco columbarius
Gyrfalcon, Falco rusticolus (V)(R)
Peregrine falcon, Falco peregrinus (B)

New World and African parrots
Order: PsittaciformesFamily: Psittacidae

Parrots are small to large birds with a characteristic curved beak. Their upper mandibles have slight mobility in the joint with the skull and they have a generally erect stance. All parrots are zygodactyl, having the four toes on each foot placed two at the front and two to the back. Most of the more than 150 species in this family are found in the New World. One species has been recorded in Rhode Island.

Monk parakeet, Myiopsitta monachus (I)(B)

Tyrant flycatchers

Order: PasseriformesFamily: Tyrannidae

Tyrant flycatchers are Passerine birds which occur throughout North and South America. They superficially resemble the Old World flycatchers, but are more robust and have stronger bills. They do not have the sophisticated vocal capabilities of the songbirds. Most, but not all, are rather plain. As the name implies, most are insectivorous. Eighteen species have been recorded in Rhode Island.

Ash-throated flycatcher, Myiarchus cinerascens (V)(R)
Great crested flycatcher, Myiarchus crinitus (B)
Western kingbird, Tyrannus verticalis (R)
Eastern kingbird, Tyrannus tyrannus (B)
Scissor-tailed flycatcher, Tyrannus forficatus (V)(R)
Fork-tailed flycatcher, Tyrannus savana (V)(R)
Olive-sided flycatcher, Contopus cooperi 
Eastern wood-pewee, Contopus virens (B)
Yellow-bellied flycatcher, Empidonax flaviventris
Acadian flycatcher, Empidonax virescens (B)
Alder flycatcher, Empidonax alnorum 
Willow flycatcher, Empidonax traillii (B)
Least flycatcher, Empidonax minimus (B)
Hammond's flycatcher, Empidonax hammondii (V)(R)
Dusky flycatcher, Empidonax oberholseri (V)(R)
Eastern phoebe, Sayornis phoebe (B)
Say's phoebe, Sayornis saya (V)(R)
Vermilion flycatcher, Pyrocephalus rubinus (V)(R)

Vireos, shrike-babblers, and erpornis

Order: PasseriformesFamily: Vireonidae

The vireos are a group of small to medium-sized passerine birds. They are typically greenish in color and resemble wood warblers apart from their heavier bills. Eight species have been recorded in Rhode Island.

White-eyed vireo, Vireo griseus (B)
Bell's vireo, Vireo bellii (V)(R)
Yellow-throated vireo, Vireo flavifrons (B)
Blue-headed vireo, Vireo solitarius (B)
Philadelphia vireo, Vireo philadelphicus
Warbling vireo, Vireo gilvus (B)
Red-eyed vireo, Vireo olivaceus (B)
Black-whiskered vireo, Vireo altiloquus (V)(R)

Shrikes
Order: PasseriformesFamily: Laniidae

Shrikes are passerine birds known for their habit of catching other birds and small animals and impaling the uneaten portions of their bodies on thorns. A shrike's beak is hooked, like that of a typical bird of prey. Two species have been recorded in Rhode Island.

Loggerhead shrike, Lanius ludovicianus (V)(R) extirpated
Northern shrike, Lanius borealis

Crows, jays, and magpies

Order: PasseriformesFamily: Corvidae

The family Corvidae includes crows, ravens, jays, choughs, magpies, treepies, nutcrackers, and ground jays. Corvids are above average in size among the Passeriformes, and some of the larger species show high levels of intelligence. Five species have been recorded in Rhode Island.

Blue jay, Cyanocitta cristata (B)
Eurasian jackdaw, Coloeus monedula (V)(R)
American crow, Corvus brachyrhynchos (B)
Fish crow, Corvus ossifragus (B)
Common raven, Corvus corax

Tits, chickadees, and titmice
Order: PasseriformesFamily: Paridae

The Paridae are mainly small stocky woodland species with short stout bills. Some have crests. They are adaptable birds, with a mixed diet including seeds and insects. Three species have been recorded in Rhode Island.

Black-capped chickadee, Poecile atricapilla (B)
Boreal chickadee, Poecile hudsonica (V)(R)
Tufted titmouse, Baeolophus bicolor (V)(B)

Larks
Order: PasseriformesFamily: Alaudidae

Larks are small terrestrial birds with often extravagant songs and display flights. Most larks are fairly dull in appearance. Their food is insects and seeds. One species has been recorded in Rhode Island.

Horned lark, Eremophila alpestris (B)

Swallows
Order: PasseriformesFamily: Hirundinidae

The family Hirundinidae is adapted to aerial feeding. They have a slender streamlined body, long pointed wings, and a short bill with a wide gape. The feet are adapted to perching rather than walking, and the front toes are partially joined at the base. Seven species have been recorded in Rhode Island.

Bank swallow, Riparia riparia (B)
Tree swallow, Tachycineta bicolor (B)
Northern rough-winged swallow, Stelgidopteryx serripennis (B)
Purple martin, Progne subis (B)
Barn swallow, Hirundo rustica (B)
Cliff swallow, Petrochelidon pyrrhonota (B)
Cave swallow, Petrochelidon fulva (R)

Kinglets
Order: PasseriformesFamily: Regulidae

The kinglets are a small family of birds which resemble the titmice. They are very small insectivorous birds. The adults have colored crowns, giving rise to their name. Two species have been recorded in Rhode Island.

Ruby-crowned kinglet, Corthylio calendula
Golden-crowned kinglet, Regulus satrapa (B)

Nuthatches
Order: PasseriformesFamily: Sittidae

Nuthatches are small woodland birds. They have the unusual ability to climb down trees head first, unlike other birds which can only go upwards. Nuthatches have big heads, short tails, and powerful bills and feet. Two species have been recorded in Rhode Island.

Red-breasted nuthatch, Sitta canadensis (B)
White-breasted nuthatch, Sitta carolinensis (B)

Waxwings
Order: PasseriformesFamily: Bombycillidae

The waxwings are a group of passerine birds with soft silky plumage and unique red tips to some of the wing feathers. In the Bohemian and cedar waxwings, these tips look like sealing wax and give the group its name. These are arboreal birds of northern forests. They live on insects in summer and berries in winter. Two species have been recorded in Rhode Island.

Bohemian waxwing, Bombycilla garrulus (V)(R)
Cedar waxwing, Bombycilla cedrorum (B)

Silky-flycatchers
Order: PasseriformesFamily: Ptiliogonatidae

The silky-flycatchers are a small family of passerine birds which occur mainly in Central America. They are related to waxwings and most species have small crests. One species has been recorded in Rhode Island.

Phainopepla, Phainopepla nitens (V)(R)

Treecreepers
Order: PasseriformesFamily: Certhiidae

Treecreepers are small woodland birds, brown above and white below. They have thin pointed downcurved bills, which they use to extricate insects from bark. They have stiff tail feathers, like woodpeckers, which they use to support themselves on vertical tree trunks and limbs. One species has been recorded in Rhode Island.

Brown creeper, Certhia americana (B)

Gnatcatchers
Order: PasseriformesFamily: Polioptilidae

These dainty birds resemble Old World warblers in their structure and habits, moving restlessly through the foliage seeking insects. The gnatcatchers are mainly soft bluish gray in color and have the typical insectivore's long sharp bill. Many species have distinctive black head patterns (especially males) and long, regularly cocked, black-and-white tails. One species has been recorded in Rhode Island.

Blue-gray gnatcatcher, Polioptila caerulea (B)

Wrens

Order: PasseriformesFamily: Troglodytidae

Wrens are small and inconspicuous birds, except for their loud songs. They have short wings and a thin downturned bill. Several species often hold their tails upright. All are insectivorous. Seven species have been recorded in Rhode Island.

Rock wren, Salpinctes obsoletus (V)(R)
House wren, Troglodytes aedon (B)
Winter wren, Troglodytes hiemalis (B)
Sedge wren, Cistothorus platensis (R)(B)
Marsh wren, Cistothorus palustris (B)
Carolina wren, Thryothorus ludovicianus (B)
Bewick's wren, Thryomanes bewickii (V)(R)

Mockingbirds and thrashers
Order: PasseriformesFamily: Mimidae

The mimids are a family of passerine birds which includes thrashers, mockingbirds, tremblers, and the New World catbirds. These birds are notable for their vocalization, especially their remarkable ability to mimic a wide variety of birds and other sounds heard outdoors. The species tend towards dull grays and browns in their appearance. Three species have been recorded in Rhode Island.

Gray catbird, Dumetella carolinensis (B)
Brown thrasher, Toxostoma rufum (B)
Northern mockingbird, Mimus polyglottos (B)

Starlings
Order: PasseriformesFamily: Sturnidae

Starlings are small to medium-sized Old World passerine birds with strong feet. Their flight is strong and direct and most are very gregarious. Their preferred habitat is fairly open country, and they eat insects and fruit. The plumage of several species is dark with a metallic sheen. One species has been recorded in Rhode Island.

European starling, Sturnus vulgaris (I)(B)

Thrushes and allies

Order: PasseriformesFamily: Turdidae

The thrushes are a group of passerine birds that occur mainly but not exclusively in the Old World. They are plump, soft plumaged, small to medium-sized insectivores or sometimes omnivores, often feeding on the ground. Many have attractive songs. Twelve species have been recorded in Rhode Island.

Eastern bluebird, Sialia sialis (B)
Mountain bluebird, Sialia currucoides (V)(R)
Townsend's solitaire, Myadestes townsendi (V)(R)
Veery, Catharus fuscescens (B)
Gray-cheeked thrush, Catharus minimus
Bicknell's thrush, Catharus bicknelli (R) 
Swainson's thrush, Catharus ustulatus 
Hermit thrush, Catharus guttatus (B)
Wood thrush, Hylocichla mustelina (B)
Redwing, Turdus iliacus (V)(R)
American robin, Turdus migratorius (B)
Varied thrush, Ixoreus naevius (V)(R)

Old World flycatchers
Order: PasseriformesFamily: Muscicapidae

The Old World flycatchers are a large family of small passerine birds mostly restricted to the Old World. These are mainly small arboreal insectivores, many of which, as the name implies, take their prey on the wing. One species has been recorded in Rhode Island.

Northern wheatear, Oenanthe oenanthe (V)(R)

Old World sparrows
Order: PasseriformesFamily: Passeridae

Old World sparrows are small passerine birds. In general, sparrows tend to be small plump brownish or grayish birds with short tails and short powerful beaks. Sparrows are seed eaters, but they also consume small insects. One species has been recorded in Rhode Island.

House sparrow, Passer domesticus (I)(B)

Wagtails and pipits
Order: PasseriformesFamily: Motacillidae

Motacillidae is a family of small passerine birds with medium to long tails. They include the wagtails, longclaws, and pipits. They are slender ground-feeding insectivores of open country. One species have been recorded in Rhode Island.

American pipit, Anthus rubescens

Finches, euphonias, and allies

Order: PasseriformesFamily: Fringillidae

Finches are seed-eating passerine birds, that are small to moderately large and have a strong beak, usually conical and in some species very large. All have twelve tail feathers and nine primaries. These birds have a bouncing flight with alternating bouts of flapping and gliding on closed wings, and most sing well. Ten species have been recorded in Rhode Island.

Evening grosbeak, Coccothraustes vespertinus (B)
Pine grosbeak, Pinicola enucleator (V)(R)
House finch, Haemorhous mexicanus (B)
Purple finch, Haemorhous purpureus (B)
Common redpoll, Acanthis flammea
Hoary redpoll, Acanthis hornemanni (V)(R)
Red crossbill, Loxia curvirostra 
White-winged crossbill, Loxia leucoptera 
Pine siskin, Spinus pinus 
American goldfinch, Spinus tristis (B)

Longspurs and snow buntings
Order: PasseriformesFamily: Calcariidae

The Calcariidae are a group of passerine birds that were traditionally grouped with the New World sparrows, but differ in a number of respects and are usually found in open grassy areas.  Three species have been recorded in Rhode Island.

Lapland longspur, Calcarius lapponicus
Smith's longspur, Calcarius pictus (V)(R)
Snow bunting, Plectrophenax nivalis

New world sparrows

Order: PasseriformesFamily: Passerellidae

Until 2017, these species were considered part of the family Emberizidae. Most of the species are known as sparrows, but these birds are not closely related to the Old World sparrows which are in the family Passeridae. Many of these have distinctive head patterns. Twenty-five species have been recorded in Rhode Island.

Grasshopper sparrow, Ammodramus savannarum (B)
Lark sparrow, Chondestes grammacus
Lark bunting, Calamospiza melanocorys (V)(R)
Chipping sparrow, Spizella passerina (B)
Clay-colored sparrow, Spizella pallida
Field sparrow, Spizella pusilla (B)
Fox sparrow, Passerella iliaca
American tree sparrow, Spizelloides arborea
Dark-eyed junco, Junco hyemalis (B)
White-crowned sparrow, Zonotrichia leucophrys
Harris's sparrow, Zonotrichia querula (V)(R)
White-throated sparrow, Zonotrichia albicollis (B)
Vesper sparrow, Pooecetes gramineus (B)
LeConte's sparrow, Ammospiza leconteii (V)(R)
Seaside sparrow, Ammospiza maritima (B)
Nelson's sparrow, Ammospiza nelsoni
Saltmarsh sparrow, Ammospiza caudacuta (B)
Henslow's sparrow, Centronyx henslowii (V)(R)(B)
Savannah sparrow, Passerculus sandwichensis (B)
Song sparrow, Melospiza melodia (B)
Lincoln's sparrow, Melospiza lincolnii 
Swamp sparrow, Melospiza georgiana (B)
Green-tailed towhee, Pipilo chlorurus (V)(R)
Eastern towhee, Pipilo erythrophthalmus (B)
Spotted towhee, Pipilo maculatus (V)(R)

Yellow-breasted chat
Order: PasseriformesFamily: Icteriidae

This species was historically placed in the wood-warblers (Parulidae) but nonetheless most authorities were unsure if it belonged there. It was placed in its own family in 2017.

Yellow-breasted chat, Icteria virens (B)

Troupials and allies

Order: PasseriformesFamily: Icteridae

The icterids are a group of small to medium-sized, often colorful passerine birds restricted to the New World and include the grackles, New World blackbirds, and New World orioles. Most species have black as a predominant plumage color, often enlivened by yellow, orange, or red. Thirteen species have been recorded in Rhode Island.

Yellow-headed blackbird, Xanthocephalus xanthocephalus (R)
Bobolink, Dolichonyx oryzivorus (B)
Eastern meadowlark, Sturnella magna (B)
Western meadowlark, Sturnella neglecta (V)(R)
Orchard oriole, Icterus spurius (B)
Bullock's oriole, Icterus bullockii (V)(R)
Baltimore oriole, Icterus galbula (B)
Red-winged blackbird, Agelaius phoeniceus (B)
Brown-headed cowbird, Molothrus ater (B)
Rusty blackbird, Euphagus carolinus 
Brewer's blackbird, Euphagus cyanocephalus (V)(R)
Common grackle, Quiscalus quiscula (B)
Boat-tailed grackle, Quiscalus major (V)(R)

New World warblers

Order: PasseriformesFamily: Parulidae

The wood-warblers are a group of small often colorful passerine birds restricted to the New World. Most are arboreal, but some are more terrestrial. Most members of this family are insectivores. Thirty-nine species have been recorded in Rhode Island.

Ovenbird, Seiurus aurocapilla (B)
Worm-eating warbler, Helmitheros vermivorus (B)
Louisiana waterthrush, Parkesia motacilla (B)
Northern waterthrush, Parkesia noveboracensis (B)
Golden-winged warbler, Vermivora chrysoptera (B)
Blue-winged warbler, Vermivora cyanoptera (B)
Black-and-white warbler, Mniotilta varia (B)
Prothonotary warbler, Protonotaria citrea (B)
Swainson's warbler, Limnothlypis swainsonii (V)(R)
Tennessee warbler, Leiothlypis peregrina
Orange-crowned warbler, Leiothlypis celata
Nashville warbler, Leiothlypis ruficapilla(B)
Virginia's warbler, Leiothlypis virginiae (V)(R)
Connecticut warbler, Oporornis agilis
Mourning warbler, Geothlypis philadelphia 
Kentucky warbler, Geothlypis formosa
Common yellowthroat, Geothlypis trichas (B)
Hooded warbler, Setophaga citrina (B)
American redstart, Setophaga ruticilla (B)
Cape May warbler, Setophaga tigrina
Cerulean warbler, Setophaga cerulea (B)
Northern parula, Setophaga americana (B)
Magnolia warbler, Setophaga magnolia 
Bay-breasted warbler, Setophaga castanea
Blackburnian warbler, Setophaga fusca (B)
Yellow warbler, Setophaga petechia (B)
Chestnut-sided warbler, Setophaga pensylvanica (B)
Blackpoll warbler, Setophaga striata 
Black-throated blue warbler, Setophaga caerulescens (B)
Palm warbler, Setophaga palmarum
Pine warbler, Setophaga pinus (B)
Yellow-rumped warbler, Setophaga coronata (B)
Yellow-throated warbler, Setophaga dominica
Prairie warbler, Setophaga discolor (B)
Black-throated gray warbler, Setophaga nigrescens (V)(R)
Townsend's warbler, Setophaga townsendi (V)(R)
Black-throated green warbler, Setophaga virens (B)
Canada warbler, Cardellina canadensis (B)
Wilson's warbler, Cardellina pusilla

Cardinals and allies

Order: PasseriformesFamily: Cardinalidae

The cardinals are a family of robust, seed-eating birds with strong bills. They are typically associated with open woodland. The sexes usually have distinct plumages. Ten species have been recorded in Rhode Island.

Summer tanager, Piranga rubra
Scarlet tanager, Piranga olivacea (B)
Western tanager, Piranga ludoviciana (V)(R)
Northern cardinal, Cardinalis cardinalis (B)
Rose-breasted grosbeak, Pheucticus ludovicianus (B)
Black-headed grosbeak, Pheucticus melanocephalus (V)(R)
Blue grosbeak, Passerina caerulea 
Indigo bunting, Passerina cyanea (B)
Painted bunting, Passerina ciris (V)(R)
Dickcissel, Spiza americana

Notes

References

See also
List of birds
Lists of birds by region
List of North American birds

Rhode Island-related lists
Rhode Island